Rune Gustafsson (1 December 1919 – 25 June 2011) was a Swedish middle-distance runner who broke the 1000 m world record in Borås in 1946. He lowered the previous record by Rudolf Harbig by 0.1 s to 2:21.4 min. The same year he also won the national and European titles in the 800 m.

References

1919 births
Swedish male middle-distance runners
2011 deaths
European Athletics Championships medalists